Queen Louise may refer to:
Louise of Lorraine (1553–1601), Queen consort of France
Marie Louise d'Orléans (1662–1689), Queen consort of Spain
Louise of Mecklenburg-Güstrow (1667–1721), Queen consort of Denmark and Norway
Louise Élisabeth d'Orléans (1709–1742), Queen consort of Spain
Louise of Great Britain (1724–1751), Queen consort of Denmark and Norway
Louise of Mecklenburg-Strelitz (1776–1810), Queen consort of Prussia
Marie Louise of Austria (1791–1847), Queen consort of Italy, Empress consort of the French
Louise of Orléans (1812–1850), Queen consort of the Belgians
Louise of Hesse-Kassel (1817–1898), Queen consort of Denmark
Louise of the Netherlands (1828–1871), Queen consort of Sweden and Norway
Louise of Sweden (1851–1926), Queen consort of Denmark
Louise Mountbatten (1889–1965), Queen consort of Sweden
Queen Louise League, a German pro-monarchic women's organization
Queen Louise Island, Greenland
Queen Louise Land, Greenland
Queen Louise (1927 film), a German silent historical film
Queen Louise (1957 film), a West German historical drama film